Leporinus melanopleurodes is a species of Leporinus found in the Rio das Almas and Rio Jiquiriçá in Bahia, Brazil in South America. This species can reach a length of  SL.

References

Taxa named by José Luis Olivan Birindelli
Taxa named by Heraldo Antonio Britski
Taxa named by Júlio César Garavello
Taxa described in 2013
Fish described in 2013
Anostomidae